Mud Rural District is a rural district (dehestan) in Mud District, Sarbisheh County, South Khorasan Province, Iran. At the 2006 census, its population was 4,403, in 1,346 families.  The rural district has 40 villages.

References 

Rural Districts of South Khorasan Province
Sarbisheh County